Vasiljević is a Serbian surname of Ancient Greek origins deriving from the word "Basileios" meaning "Royal", and originally only given to children of royal or noble birth. In the 4th century A. D., the name was born by Saint Basillos, the bishop of Caesarea, and long regarded as one of the four fathers of the Eastern (Christian) Church. It is said that, in some cases, the name derives from the female form of the name, and specifically from Saint Basilla, who, in the year 304 A. D., chose death rather than marry a Pagan. Up to the 11th century, the name was a personal name, was usually born by clerics. However, after the Crusades, it became popular for returning soldiers to christen their children with Hebrew or biblical names, and thereby to commemorate the fathers deeds in the Holy Land.

People
 Aco Vasiljević (born 1973), Serbian footballer
 Aleksandar Vasiljević (general)
 Aleksandar Vasiljević (footballer, born 1982)
 Aleksandar Vasiljević (footballer, born 2001)
 Dušan Vasiljević (footballer) (born 1982), Serbian footballer
 Mirka Vasiljević (born 1990), Serbian actress, model and television presenter
 Mitar Vasiljević (born 1954), Bosnia and Herzegovina war criminal
 Nikola Vasiljević (born 1983), Bosnia and Herzegovina footballer
 Nikola Vasiljević (born 1983), Serbian footballer
 Petar Vasiljević (born 1970), Serbian footballer
 Saša Vasiljević (born 1979), Bosnia and Herzegovina basketball player

See also 
 Vasilijević, surname
 Vasilić, surname

References

Citations 

Serbian surnames
Patronymic surnames
Surnames from given names